ZDT may refer to:
 ZDT's Amusement Park, a family amusement park in Seguin, TX
 Zero Dark Thirty, a 2012 film by Kathryn Bigelow
 a graphics file format used by TECH Win, see Comparison of graphics file formats
 ZDT, a 1986 novel by Julian Rathbone